"Glaub an mich" is a song by German recording artist Yvonne Catterfeld. It was written by Steve van Velvet, Yasemin Kaldirim and produced by Jeo and Lalo Titenkov for her third studio album Unterwegs (2005).

Charts

Weekly charts

Year-end charts

References

External links
 YvonneCatterfeld.com – official site

2005 singles
2005 songs
Yvonne Catterfeld songs
Hansa Records singles